Great Adventure Cigar is the debut full-length by the band Janus Stark, released in 1998 on Earache Records. Its name comes from a line in the Wu Tang Clan song "The Projects".

Two singles were released from this album, "Dynamo" (1998) and "Every Little Thing Counts" (1999). "Every Little Thing Counts" was also included on the soundtrack for the 1998 film, Disturbing Behavior & in the 1999 film, Varsity Blues (film).

Release history

Track listing
All songs written by Graham “Gizz” Butt except where indicated.
 "Enemy Lines" - 3:43
 "Panic Attack" - 3:14
 "Every Little Thing Counts" - 4:01 written by Graham “Gizz” Butt and Andrew “Pinch” Pinching
 "Floyd (What are you on?)" - 3:59 written by Graham “Gizz” Butt and Andrew “Pinch” Pinching
 "Dynamo" - 5:43 
 "White Man Speak with Fork Tongue" - 4:10
 "Clique" - 3:56
 "New Slant on Nothing" - 3:52
 "200 Duty Frees" - 4:50
 "Barriers" - 4:45

Personnel
 Gizz Butt - guitars, lead vocals
 Shop - bass, backing vocals
 Pinch - drums, backing vocals

Guest musicians
 Terry Thomas - backing vocals (tracks 1, 4, 5, 8)
 Simon Burrel - backing vocals (track 1), Hammond organ (track 2), Jazz piano (track 9)
 Andy Hawkins - backing vocals (track 2)
 Richard Gombault - backing vocals (track 2)
 Shaun Atkins - backing vocals (track 5)

References

1998 debut albums
Janus Stark (band) albums